The Twin is a horror TV movie directed by Fred Olen Ray and Max Derin, starring Brigid Brannagh and Louis Mandylor. It premiered on Lifetime on January 6, 2017.

Plot synopsis 
A woman (Brigid Brannagh) springs into action after discovering that Derek (Timothy Granaderos), the twin brother of her daughter's boyfriend, Tyler escapes from a mental institution and hatches a twisted plan for revenge.

Cast 
 Brigid Brannagh as Ashley
 Timothy Granaderos as Derek Wells / Tyler Wells
 Louis Mandylor as Jeke
 Jess Gabor as Jocelyn
 Calista Carradine as Sherri
 Mark Lindsay Chapman as Dr. Rubin
 Tracy Brooks Swope as Collins
 David Novak as Johnson
 Tata Loveless

Reception 
Vocal Geeks said, "while The Twin has issues of originality and plotting, the acting more than makes this worth a few watches."

References

External links 
 
 The Twin on Lifetime Television

2017 television films
2017 films
2017 horror films
American horror television films
Films directed by Fred Olen Ray
2010s American films